The 42nd People's Choice Awards, honoring the best in popular culture for 2015, were held January 6, 2016, at the Microsoft Theater in Los Angeles, California, and were broadcast live on CBS. The ceremony was hosted by Jane Lynch. Nominations were announced on November 3, 2015.

Performances
Shawn Mendes — "Stitches"
Shawn Mendes and Camila Cabello — "I Know What You Did Last Summer"
Jason Derulo — "Get Ugly", "Want to Want Me"
Jordan Smith, accompanied by David Foster — "You Are So Beautiful"

Presenters

Melissa Benoist
Mayim Bialik
Jack Black
Betsy Brandt
Priyanka Chopra
Chris D'Elia
Adam DeVine
Vin Diesel
Natalie Dormer
Mike Epps
Meagan Good
Clark Gregg
Colin Hanks
Marcia Gay Harden
Josh Holloway
Kate Hudson
Cheyenne Jackson
Raza Jaffrey
Dakota Johnson
Taylor Kinney
Nia Long
Lea Michele
Christina Milian
Kunal Nayyar
The Pink Ladies of Grease: Live (Julianne Hough, Vanessa Hudgens, Keke Palmer, Kether Donohue and Carly Rae Jepsen)
Melissa Rauch
Gina Rodriguez
Abigail Spencer
John Stamos
Meghan Trainor
Amber Valletta
Ming-Na Wen
Ed Westwick
Alison Brie
Shemar Moore

Winners and nominees
The full list of nominees was announced on November 3, 2015. Winners are listed first and in boldface.

Movies

Television

Music

Digital

Controversy
When The Talk won Favorite Daytime TV Hosting Team, host and creator Sara Gilbert was interrupted by 20-year-old aspiring rapper Zacari Nicasio. Nicasio grabbed the mic and said "My name is Zacari Nicasio. Shout out to Kevin Gates he has an album; Yeezy jumped over the jumpman yes sir..." Shortly after Nicasio grabbed the mic, Sharon Osbourne kicked him twice, and then Sheryl Underwood told Niciasio "You ain't gonna pull no Steve Harvey up in here [no] no sir, no sir. Security!" After Gilbert continued her speech, Aisha Tyler joked about the incident when Gilbert said they are the "Mötley Crüe of misfits" which Tyler replied "But that guy is not in our club." Osbourne added to the joke saying "Get the **** off my stage!" Osbourne also flipped off Nicasio twice as he was taken away by security during Gilbert's speech. Julie Chen told Entertainment Tonight moments after the incident "[Osbourne] always said you mess with one of us you mess with all of us." The incident was heavily talked about on their show following the awards. After ranting about his behavior, Osbourne warned him on The Talk, “If I see him again, I'd kick him again!" Tyler told him to "practice yo speech in the bathroom dude" if he was going interrupt an award show and also mocked his speech on the show as well saying "Imma give a shout out to Spooky and them and I like cheese sandwiches." Gilbert said about being interrupted "When he first came up I just thought oh somebody's trying to steal the spotlight and it's kinda funny even though it's not right because we wanna speak to our fans and you know all of that. But there was something amusing about it. When it was unintelligible I got scared there was something wrong with him." Underwood also mentioned on The Talk that Harvey gave Underwood permission to use that joke because she had been saying it a lot and didn't want to hurt his feelings as he is a personal friend of Underwood. Underwood also stated she almost pushed Nicasio off the stage but she didn't as she feared of a lawsuit saying "When our boy was coming up to the stage I was like 'Oh hell no' and then I thought if I got on this dude and knocked him down the stairs then maybe its a lawsuit and we all get sued and network close down. For then I thought if I strong-armed the dude and kinda push him off and get him out of here."

Niciasio had no remorse over the incident but asked Osbourne to apologize and take him to dinner at The Cheesecake Factory.

On March 3, 2016, Gilbert, Underwood, and Osbourne brought up the incident again on The Talk during their conversation of a woman defending herself at gunpoint in a convenience store. Glibert said "I was thinking about [the woman defending herself] when I was watching how I would react and then I realized how I would react because we had it not a criminal situation but the guy [Niciasio] that came up during the People's Choice Awards. You two [Osbourne and Underwood] were kicking [Niciasio] off the stage and I was scared and just went quiet. You know I would just shut down and hand him the money." Osbourne joked "We were just scared that [Niciasio] was gonna sing. That would have been much scarier."

On June 13, 2016, Sara Gilbert brought up the incident again with Mike Epps who was a guest on The Talk.

Ironically, six months prior to the awards, Tyler was asked by Jason Derulo at the 2015 Ubisoft E3 press conference to dance with him after Tyler remarked that she was glad to not dance up there with him as she pointed out she is not a good dancer. Derulo jokingly was disappointed that Tyler didn't crash his performance.

References

January 2016 events in the United States
People's Choice Awards
2016 in American television
2016 in Los Angeles
2016 awards in the United States